Events from the year 1233 in Ireland.

Incumbent
Lord: Henry III

Events
A fragment of that Holy rood was brought to Holy Cross Abbey, County Tipperary by the Plantagenet Queen-mother, Isabella of Angoulême, around 1233.

References

 
1230s in Ireland
Ireland
Years of the 13th century in Ireland